Araplus or Araplos was an ancient Greek city located in ancient Thrace, located in the region of the Thracian Chersonesus. It is cited in the Periplus of Pseudo-Scylax, in the fifth position of its recitation of the towns of the Thracian Chersonesus, along with Cardia, Ide, Paeon, Alopeconnesus, Araplus, Elaeus and Sestos.

Its site is unlocated.

See also
Greek colonies in Thrace

References

Populated places in ancient Thrace
Former populated places in Turkey
Greek colonies in the Thracian Chersonese
Lost ancient cities and towns